
Year 17 BC was either a common year starting on Sunday or Monday or a leap year starting on Saturday, Sunday or Monday (link will display the full calendar) of the Julian calendar (the sources differ, see leap year error for further information) and a leap year starting on Friday of the Proleptic Julian calendar. At the time, it was known as the Year of the Consulship of Furnius and Silanus (or, less frequently, year 737 Ab urbe condita). The denomination 17 BC for this year has been used since the early medieval period, when the Anno Domini calendar era became the prevalent method in Europe for naming years.

Events 
 By place 

 Roman Empire 
 Emperor Augustus adopts Gaius and Lucius Caesar. 
 Emperor Augustus celebrates the secular games in Rome, for which Horace's hymn the "Carmen Saeculare" is commissioned.

Births 
 December 11 – Gnaeus Domitius Ahenobarbus, son of Lucius Domitius Ahenobarbus and Antonia Major (d. AD 40)
 Arminius, Germanic chieftain who defeated the Romans at the Battle of the Teutoburg Forest (d. AD 21)
 Lucius Caesar, son of Marcus Vipsanius Agrippa and Julia the Elder (d. AD 2)

Deaths 
 Asander, Roman client king of the Bosporan Kingdom (b. 110 BC)

References